Helocarpaceae is a family of lichen-forming fungi in the subclass Lecanoromycetidae. The family is monotypic, and contains the single genus Helocarpon.

Systematics
The family is classified as incertae sedis with respect to ordinal placement in the class Lecanoromycetidae, as there is no reliable molecular data available to establish phylogenetic relationships with similar taxa.

Genus Helocarpon was circumscribed by Swedish botanist Theodor Magnus Fries (1832–1913), in 1860, with Helocarpon crassipes assigned as the type species, which grows over moss. It was originally found in Finnmark in Norway.

Joseph Hafellner in 1984 described a new monotypic family, Helocarpaceae to contain the genus Helocarpon. Then Eriksson et al in 2004, placed Helocarpon as a genus within the Micareaceae family, along with genera; Micarea, Psilolechia, Roccellinastrum and Scutula.

In 2005, molecular phylogeny based on mitochondrial rDNA sequences showed that the genus was not related to the Micareaceae family. Helocarpaceae was re-instated to hold the genus Helocarpon.

Distribution
The 2 species in the genus have a Holarctic distribution, as they are mainly found in northern temperate regions, especially in Europe, including Switzerland, Slovakia, Italy, Norway, Finland, Sweden, Russia, Greenland, and Australia.

Helocarpon crassipes is also found in Japan.

They are also found in North America in the coastal forests of Oregon, USA. Helocarpon lesdainii has been found on Picea sitchensis trees in Harris Beach State Park, Oregon.

Description
Helocarpaceae species are crustose lichens, with tube-like amyloid structures.

The genera are generally distinguished by a crustose thallus and chlorococcoid photobiont (relating to green algae of the genus Chlorococcum). They are usually immarginate (not having a distinctive margin or border) and convex biatorine apothecia. When the margin of the spore body is pale or colorless, it is called 'biatorine'. They also have a poorly developed proper exciple (margin), simple or sparsely branched to abundantly branched and anastomosed (connected) paraphyses (the erect sterile filaments often occurring among the reproductive organs). The asci has an apical cushion surrounded by a tube-structure, colourless and simple (ellipsoid or tear-shaped) to transversely septate asco-spores which are lacking perispore (outer covering of a spore). They have immersed (surrounded), sessile or stalked pycnidia (asexual fruiting body), and an abundance of conidial types.

Species
, Species Fungorum accepts two species of Helocarpon;
Helocarpon crassipes 
Helocarpon lesdainii 

Former species;
 H. arcticum  = Frutidella caesioatra, Lecanoraceae family
 H. gelatinosum  = Trapeliopsis gelatinosa, Trapeliaceae
 H. granulosum  = Trapeliopsis granulosa, Trapeliaceae
 H. granulosum f. escharoides  = Trapeliopsis gelatinosa, Trapeliaceae
 H. sapineum  = Trapeliopsis granulosa, Trapeliaceae
 H. viridescens  = Trapeliopsis viridescens, Trapeliaceae

References

Lecanoromycetes
Lichen families
Lecanoromycetes families
Taxa named by Josef Hafellner
Taxa described in 1860
Monogeneric fungus families